VNBG may refer to:
 Bajhang Airport (ICAO airport code)
 von Neumann–Bernays–Gödel set theory